Emiel Verstrynge (born 4 February 2002) is a Belgian cyclist, who currently rides UCI Continental team . He won the silver medal at the 2022 UCI Cyclo-cross Under-23 World Championships.

Major results

Cyclo-cross

2018–2019
 Junior Brico Cross
2nd Hulst
2019–2020
 1st Junior Gullegem
 1st Vittel
 Junior DVV Trophy
2nd Kortrijk
3rd Ronse
 3rd  UCI World Junior Championships
 3rd National Junior Championships
 UCI Junior World Cup
3rd Nommay
3rd Bern
 Junior Superprestige
3rd Diegem
 Junior Ethias Cross
3rd Eeklo
2021–2022
 1st  National Under-23 Championships
 2nd  UCI World Under-23 Championships
 3rd Overall UCI Under-23 World Cup
1st Flamanville
 Under-23 X²O Badkamers Trophy
3rd Loenhout
2022–2023
 1st  UEC European Under-23 Championships
 1st Bad Salzdetfurth
 Under-23 X²O Badkamers Trophy
1st Kortrijk
1st Herentals
2nd Koksijde
2nd Lille
 Exact Cross
2nd Essen
 UCI Under-23 World Cup
3rd Tábor
3rd Benidorm
3rd Besançon

Road
2022
 1st  Overall Giro del Friuli Venezia Giulia
1st  Young rider classification

References

External links

Emiel Verstrynge at Cyclocross 24

2002 births
Living people
Belgian male cyclists
Cyclo-cross cyclists
People from Maldegem
Cyclists from East Flanders
21st-century Belgian people